Do Rudan (also Romanized as Do Rūdān and Dorūdān; also known as Qal‘eh-ye Ājal Beyg) is a village in Hayaquq-e Nabi Rural District, in the Central District of Tuyserkan County, Hamadan Province, Iran. At the 2006 census, its population was 59, in 18 families.

References 

Populated places in Tuyserkan County